Events in the year 2016 in Namibia.

Incumbents
President: Hage Geingob
Vice President: Nickey Iyambo
Prime Minister: Saara Kuugongelwa
Chief Justice: Peter Shivute

Events

Sport
28-31 January – the 2016 African Archery Championships were held in Windhoek
5-21 August – Namibia at the 2016 Summer Olympics: 10 competitors in 4 sports

Deaths

6 September – Koos van Ellinckhuijzen, artist, particularly known for his works on postage stamps (b. 1942).
6 October – Hidipo Hamutenya, politician (b. 1939).

References

 
2010s in Namibia
Years of the 21st century in Namibia
Namibia
Namibia